The Yirrganydji (Irrukandji) people are an Indigenous Australian people of Queensland who trace their descent from the Irukandji and, as such, are the original custodians of a narrow coastal strip within Djabugay country that runs northwards from Cairns, Queensland to Port Douglas. Their traditional lifestyle was that of fishers along this coastal strip and around the river mouths, islands and seas between the Barron River and Port Douglas

Language
The Irukandji spoke Yirrgay, one of the five dialects of the language group generally known as Djabugay. These dialects indicate that Djabugay was genetically related to Yidiny, with a lexical overlap of 53%.

Country
Their inland extension went some 7 miles northwest of Cairns, around the tidal waters of the Barron River around Redlynch. Dialects defined tribal distinctions, and the Irukandji dialect Yirrgay, was the southernmost of the group, with the Yidinji people to their immediate south, while, northwards, one encountered, in geographic order, Guluy, Ngakali and finally Djabugay. The Bulway-speakers lay to their west, from Woree to Mareeba.

History
The Irukandji as a distinct tribal identity were close to extinction by the end of the 19th century. William Parry-Okeden, in a short report on Queensland Aboriginal people written in his capacity as Police Commissioner, wrote in 1897 that he counted 6 Yettkie, a name now thought to refer to a remnant of the Irukandji. The following year Billy Jagar, leader of the Irukandji, received a King plate, designating him as 'King of Barron', a gesture repeated in 1906 with a second plate bearing the same inscription. Jagar died at the age of 60 in 1930 in his traditional payu hut at the northern end of the Cairns Esplanade. Writing in 1974 Tindale stated:
'The term Irukandji for the people on the coast near Redlynch in the area around Cairns has been in dispute because of their early demise as a tribe. By 1952 remembrance of their existence had almost died out and a mixed Tjapukai and Mamu group, from higher up the Barron River, and from the south had usurped their territory. They call themselves the Djumbandji. The coastal Irukandji were said to have been a taller people than the rain forest dwellers. In 1964 Jack Doolan questioned several informants, none from the Cairns area, who believed the Irukandji did not exist. They based their ideas on information that irukandji meant “from the north.” They suggested that if a  Keramai (Giramai)  or a Mamu was questioned about the country from which a northern stranger might have come he  would simply refer to him as an Irukandji, that is, a “northerner.” In similar fashion he might refer to a man from the west as gambilbara, a rain forest man, or from the east as a djindigal (Jindigal).'

Modern times
In recent times there have been clashes in claims advanced respectively by the Yirrganydji Aboriginal Tribal Corporation (Dawul Wuru Aboriginal Corporation) and the Djabugay Aboriginal Tribal Corporation, the former insisting that any development projects by the Djabugay in the historic territories of their Irukandji forebears, require their consent and participation.

The Irukandji jellyfish are named after Irrukandji country.

Alternative names
 Irakanji, Yirkandji, Yirkanji.
 Yirgay.
 Yettkie. (Parry-Okeden 1897, misreading of Yerrkie.)
 Illagona.
 Wongulli. (camp toponym, at Cairns' southern city limit (1974)
 Dungara. (horde on Lower Barron River)
 Tingaree.
 Dungarah.
 Dingal.

Notes

Citations

Sources

External links
 Ausanthrop Australian Aboriginal tribal database
 ABC Radio Hindsight Abstract on Yirrganydji ancestor 'King Billy Jagar
 ABCs 'Speaking Out' The Long Journey of Billy Jagar's King Plate, regarding Yirrganydji ancestor 'King Billy Jagar

Aboriginal peoples of Queensland
Far North Queensland